Athelia rolfsii is a corticioid fungus in the family Atheliaceae. It is a facultative plant pathogen and is the causal agent of "southern blight" disease in crops.

Taxonomy
The species was first described in 1911 by Italian mycologist Pier Andrea Saccardo, based on specimens sent to him by Peter Henry Rolfs who considered the unnamed fungus to be the cause of tomato blight in Florida. The specimens sent to Saccardo were sterile, consisting of hyphae and sclerotia. He placed the species in the old form genus Sclerotium, naming it Sclerotium rolfsii. It is, however, not a species of Sclerotium in the strict sense.

In 1932, Mario Curzi discovered that the teleomorph (spore-bearing state) was a corticioid fungus and accordingly placed the species in the form genus Corticium. With a move to a more natural classification of fungi, Corticium rolfsii was transferred to Athelia in 1978.

Description
The fungus produces effused basidiocarps (fruit bodies) that are smooth and white. Microscopically, they consist of ribbon-like hyphae with clamp connections. Basidia are club-shaped, bearing four smooth, ellipsoid basidiospores, measuring 4–7 by 3–5 μm. Small, brownish sclerotia (hyphal propagules) are also formed, arising from the hyphae.

Southern blight
Athelia rolfsii occurs in soil as a saprotroph, but can also attack living plants. It has an almost indiscriminate host range, but its capacity to form sclerotia (propagules that remain in the soil) means that it particularly attacks seasonal crops. It mostly occurs in warm soils (above 15 °C) and can be a serious pest of vegetables  in tropical and subtropical regions (including Florida, where it was first recognized), causing "southern blight".

It can also be called mustard seed fungus.

Disease cycle
The soil-borne fungal pathogen Athelia rolfsii is a basidiomycete that typically exists only as mycelium and sclerotia (anamorph: Sclerotium rolfsii, or asexual state). It causes the disease Southern Blight and typically overwinters as sclerotia. The sclerotia is a survival structure composed of a hard rind and cortex containing hyphae and is typically considered the primary inoculum. The pathogen has a very large host range, affecting over 500 plant species (including tomato, onion, snapbean and pea) in the United States of America. The fungus attacks the host crown and stem tissues at the soil line by producing a number of compounds such as oxalic acid, in addition to enzymes that are pectinolytic and cellulolytic. These compounds effectively kill plant tissue and allow the fungus to enter other areas of the plant. After gaining entry, the pathogen uses the plant tissues to produce mycelium (often forming mycelial mats), as well as additional sclerotia. Sclerotia formation occurs when conditions are especially warm and humid, primarily in the summer months in the United States of America. Susceptible plants exhibit stem lesions near the soil line, and thus often wilt and eventually die. Infection caused by Southern Blight is not considered systemic.

Environment
Athelia rolfsii typically prefers warm, humid climates (whence the name of the disease, Southern Blight) which is required for optimal growth (i.e. to produce mycelium and sclerotia). This makes the disease an important issue in regions such as the Southern United States of America, especially for solanaceous crops. In addition, oxygen rich and acidic soils have also been found to favor growth of the pathogen. Southern Blight can be spread (by way of sclerotia and mycelium) by contaminated farm tools and implements, irrigation systems and infected soil and plant material.

Management
Thus, management of the disease is critical, especially in agricultural regions. Although historically management has been difficult, there are several practical ways to reduce disease pressure. Simply avoiding infected fields is perhaps the most straightforward management technique given the large host range and durability of survival structures (i.e. sclerotia). However, when this is not possible, practicing proper sanitation and implementing effective crop rotations can help. Deep tillage has also been shown to reduce Southern Blight occurrence by burying infected plant tissues and creating an anaerobic environment that hinders pathogen growth. Soil solarization and certain organic amendments (e.g. composted chicken manure and rye-vetch green manure), as well as introducing certain Trichoderma spp. have also been shown to reduce plant death and number of sclerotia produced in the field in tomatoes. In addition to these cultural methods, chemical methods (e.g. fungicides) can also be employed. These methods all disrupt the production of mycelium and sclerotia, thus reducing the spread of disease.

See also
 List of soybean diseases

References

External links
"Kudzu of the Fungal World" at NC State University

Fungal plant pathogens and diseases
Atheliales
Soybean diseases